William Calhoun McDonald (July 25, 1858 – April 11, 1918) was an American politician, and the first governor of the State of New Mexico.

Biography
McDonald was born in Jordanville, New York and was raised in New York. He attended Cazenovia Seminary. In New York, he studied law and taught primary school.

Career
In 1878, McDonald moved to Fort Scott, Kansas where he served as an apprentice at the law offices of Joseph S. Lorrence. He was admitted to the bar in 1880. That same year, McDonald moved to White Oaks, Lincoln County, New Mexico Territory. Staking out mining claims and working as a mineral surveyor, he managed and later purchased the Carrizozo Cattle Ranch Company. He became a United States deputy mineral surveyor for New Mexico in 1881, and became active in Democratic politics.

McDonald was Lincoln County Assessor from 1885 to 1887. In 1891, he was a member of the New Mexico Territorial House of Representatives. He married Francis J. McCourt on August 31, 1891. The couple had five children. He chaired the Lincoln County Board of Commissioners from 1895 to 1897. A member of the New Mexico Cattle Sanitary  Board from 1905 to 1911, he also chaired the 1910 Democratic Territorial Central Committee.

Securing the Democratic nomination, McDonald was elected the first Governor of the state of New Mexico on November 7, 1911.  During his tenure, the state's government was structured while raids by Mexican bandits were dealt with.

After his governorship, McDonald was appointed and served as New Mexico Fuel Administrator, an office he held until his death.

Death
McDonald died on April 11, 1918 and is interred at Cedarvale Cemetery in White Oaks.

References

External links
Bio at Rootsweb
National Governors Association
The Political Graveyard

1858 births
1918 deaths
People from Herkimer County, New York
People from Fort Scott, Kansas
Kansas lawyers
New Mexico lawyers
Members of the New Mexico Territorial Legislature
Democratic Party governors of New Mexico
19th-century American politicians
19th-century American lawyers